Khin-e Chomaqi (also Romanized as Khīn-e Chomāqī and Kheyn-e Chomāqī) is a village in Tus Rural District, in the Central District of Mashhad County, Razavi Khorasan Province, Iran. At the 2006 census, its population was 275, in 71 families.

References 

Populated places in Mashhad County